Zane Khan (born February 11, 2002) is an American professional tennis player.

Khan has a career high ATP singles ranking of 404 achieved on November 8, 2021.

Khan made his ATP main draw debut at the 2020 European Open in the doubles draw partnering Luca Nardi.

References

External links

2002 births
Living people
American male tennis players
Tennis players from Houston